Hudson & Rex is a Canadian police procedural drama television series, based on the Austrian-Italian drama Kommissar Rex, and it premiered on Citytv on March 25, 2019. Filming commenced in October 2018, with ongoing production in St. John's, Newfoundland and Labrador.

On May 30, 2019, Shaftesbury and Pope Productions announced Citytv had renewed for season two, and was scheduled for the 2019–2020 season. Season two premiered on September 24, 2019.

In June 2020, it was announced on Breakfast Television that season three would begin production sometime in July, ensuring to work within provincial public health guidelines in respect to the COVID-19 pandemic in Canada. Season three premiered on January 5, 2021. At the conclusion of the final season three episode, April 20, 2021, cast members announced that season four had been approved and filming would begin shortly. On September 15, 2021 it was announced that season four was set to premiere on October 7, 2021, bumped up from the original release date of October 21, 2021. Season 5 was later confirmed, set to release in October 2022.

Premise
Detective Charlie Hudson is a major crimes detective of the fictional St. John's Police Department. He is partnered with Rex, a multi-scent-trained German Shepherd with an excellent ear for unique sounds. Hudson grew up reading mystery novels and as a result always wanted to be a police detective. He is partnered with Rex after Rex's K9 human partner, Constable Grace Lindsay, was killed pursuing a kidnapper, and Rex was scheduled to be euthanized. Rex's keen nose and ears are instrumental in helping Detective Hudson advance the investigations in each episode. The duo receives assistance from Superintendent Donovan, Forensics Chief Truong, and IT Specialist Mills every episode in gathering and interpreting evidence.

The first season begins some time after Hudson has arrived back in St. John's, his hometown, following a divorce from his wife. The first case for the series is a kidnapping. Most of the episodes case different murders, each with unique twists. The background story of the teaming of Hudson and Rex is presented as the season three premiere episode.

Cast
 John Reardon as Detective Charlie Hudson, Rex’s partner
 Mayko Nguyen as Chief of Forensics Sarah Truong
 Kevin Hanchard as Superintendent Joseph Donovan
 Justin Kelly as IT Specialist Jesse Mills
 Diesel vom Burgimwald as Rex
 Raven Dauda as Sergeant Jan Renley, Rex's police trainer (seasons 1, 2 & 5)
Bridget Wareham as Dr. Karma Poole (season 5)

Episodes

Seasons one and two combined have a total of 32 episodes according to distributor Beta. Season one filmed a total of 16 episodes but the last 3 episodes of season one became the first 3 episodes of season two. Season two also filmed 16 episodes. This unusual result means there are 19 episodes to be shown as season two. Depending on where you watch the show, some show the first 3 episodes of season two as part of season one, meaning in some places both season one and two have 16 episodes.

Season 1 (2019)

Season 2 (2019–20)

Season 3 (2021)

Season 4 (2021–22)

Season 5 (2022-23)

Reception

Canadian ratings
The first six episodes of season one reached more than 2.5 million viewers in Canada.
In the 2019–2020 time period, Hudson & Rex was Citytv's highest-rated original scripted series.

Reviews
Reviewer Rob Buckley, writing for The Medium is Not Enough, criticized the writing and direction and described the show as "for the most part unwatchable, tedious".

Broadcast
Hudson & Rex premiered March 25, 2019, on Citytv with season one planned for 16 episodes. However, only the first 13 episodes were used for season one. The remaining three episodes were broadcast as part of season two.

International
Beta Film has the international English distribution rights for Hudson & Rex. Broadcaster RAI will begin showing episodes in Italy on Rai 3.

In Germany with TNT Serie and Latin America with the Belleville Group.

Other distributions are in France with France Televisions via Mediawan Rights, in Lithuania with LRT, in Latvia with LTV, in Puerto Rico with Telemundo, in Uruguay with Channel 12 and in Greece with ANT1.

In Romania, the series started airing on the channel Diva on September 3, 2019.

In The Netherlands, the show airs on FOX.

NBC Universal secured rights for Eastern Europe and Africa.

As of July 2020, the show is being broadcast in the Czech Republic on Televize Prima.

The first two seasons are also being broadcast on the Alibi TV channel in the UK which shows fictional and non-fictional crime series.

As of January 2021, the show is being broadcast in Slovakia on Jednotka.

As of June 2020, Hudson & Rex is sold to more than 100 territories. On November 5, 2021, the show premiered exclusively as part of the original programming catalogue of the Christian based streaming of family-friendly content driven cable network UP called Up Faith & Family in the United States, in addition to its planned official linear television debut on the network at some point at a yet-to-be-announced date. The show also airs on the defunct Ion Plus’s still-active free FAST channels on Plex, Samsung Free TV, The Roku Channel and Amazon Freevee with limited and sometimes, no ads.

Production

Casting
Diesel vom Burgimwald (Rex) is a 15th generation descendant of the first shepherd to star in the 1990s Austrian show Inspector Rex that Hudson & Rex is based on. Two other German Shepherds, Izzy and Iko, who are nephews of Diesel vom Burgimwald, stand-in for some of the stunts. Diesel vom Burgimwald had mobility training before being cast as Rex. This is Diesel's first show according to his owner/handler Sherri Davis and training continues on non-shooting days in preparation for future scripts. While on set Diesel has full star treatment with his own trailer, chef, and chauffeur. Diesel is an honorary firefighter with the St. John's Regional Fire Department (SJRFD) as a result of the episode Fast Eddie's.

Filming 
Hudson and Rex films at various locations across the City of St. John's, most prominently on the Memorial University of Newfoundland campus. The Bruneau Centre (formerly the Inco Centre) doubles as the headquarters for the fictional St. John's Police Department, whilst the rest of the campus has been used to portray the equally fictional Heritage University of Newfoundland and Labrador.

References

External links
 
 
 
 
 

2010s Canadian crime drama television series
Citytv original programming
2019 Canadian television series debuts
Television shows set in Newfoundland and Labrador
Canadian police procedural television series
2020s Canadian crime drama television series
Television shows filmed in St. John's, Newfoundland and Labrador
Television shows about dogs
Police dogs in fiction
Canadian television series based on non-Canadian television series
Television series by Shaftesbury Films